Clostridium aceticum is a species of bacterium in the genus Clostridium. Its name comes from the acetic acid it produces. It was first described in 1981.

References 

aceticum